Kōchi Airport , also known as Kōchi Ryōma Airport, is a regional airport in Nankoku, a city in Kōchi Prefecture of Japan.

The  airport has a single runway handling small to medium size aircraft. The  two storey terminal building is located to the north side of the runway. The arrivals level is on the first floor and departures on the second. There are 14 retail stores in the small terminal building. There is an observation deck on the third floor of the building. Transportation from the airport is by car, taxi or bus.

History
Kōchi Airport was originally built in 1944 as Kōchi Airfield for the Imperial Japanese Navy and from 1945 to 1952 the airport was under command of US forces. The airfield became a civilian airport in 1952 and first flights started operating in 1954.

In November 2003 it became the first airport in Japan to be nicknamed after a person: Bakumatsu period leader Sakamoto Ryōma.

Facts
  of cargo annually (2000)
 13,500 landings annually (2000)
 3 gates handling 37 aircraft

Statistics
 2,400,000 passengers annually (1,932,000 in 2000)

Airlines and destinations

Incidents and accidents

On 13 March 2007, All Nippon Airways Flight 1603, a Bombardier Dash 8, on a flight from Osaka to Kōchi, landed safely at the Kōchi Airport after the front wheel of the plane failed to deploy. As a result, ANA's fleet of thirteen Bombardier DHC-8 aircraft were grounded for emergency inspections.

References

External links

Kōchi Airport 
Kōchi Airport Guide from Japan Airlines

Airports in Japan
Transport in Kōchi Prefecture
Buildings and structures in Kōchi Prefecture
Airports established in 1944
1944 establishments in Japan
Nankoku, Kōchi